Kisan Rally or Kisan Long March was a large scale protest march by farmers in the Indian state of Maharashtra, organized by the All India Kisan Sabha, the peasants front of the Communist Party of India (Marxist). Around 60,000 to 70,000 farmers marched a distance of 200  km from Nashik to Mumbai to gherao the Maharashtra Vidhan Sabha. The peaceful march came to a conclusion on March 12, 2018, after the Government of Maharashtra gave assurances for fulfillment of said demands. These assurances however, were not executed which resulted in Kisan Long March 2 which commenced on February 27, 2019, but was suspended soon after.

Background 
The farming sector in the state of Maharashtra was badly affected by numerous factors including unseasonal rainfalls, hailstorm, and pest infestations. An estimated 2414 farmers had taken their lives in the state between January 1 and October 31, 2017. Considering these issues, among others, the government had announced a conditional loan waiver amounting to Rs 34,000 crore in 2017, but it was not implemented as promised.

The long march was inspired and led by the Kisan Sabha leaders Ajit Nawale, Ashok Dhawale, Jiva Pandu Gavit and Vijoo Krishnan.

See also
2020–2021 Indian farmers' protest

References 

2018 in Indian politics
2018 protests
Indian farmers